Mahmoud Dahoud (born 1 January 1996) is a professional footballer who plays as a midfielder for  club Borussia Dortmund and the Germany national team.

He made his professional debut for Bundesliga side Borussia Mönchengladbach in 2014, and, in his spell with the club, he made 86 appearances for the club before signing for Dortmund three years later.

Born in Syria, Dahoud has represented Germany internationally at U18, U19, and U21 level. He was part of the U21 side which won the UEFA European Under-21 Championship in 2017.

Club career

Gladbach
Mahmoud Dahoud began his career playing at junior level for the Langenfeld soccer club Germania Reusrath and Fortuna Düsseldorf before signing for Gladbach at the age of 14 in 2010. He then spent the next five seasons developing in Gladbach's academy before breaking into the first team in 2014.

2014–15 season
On 27 August 2014, Dahoud was handed his first team debut by manager Lucien Favre in a 7–0 Europa League play-off win over FK Sarajevo, coming off the bench in the 55th minute to replace Christoph Kramer.  Just a week prior to making his first appearance for Gladbach, Dahoud had signed his first professional contract, agreeing a deal to keep him at the club until June 2018. He only made two more senior appearances over the course of the season, one in the Europa League against Apollon and the other at the end of the season against Borussia Dortmund to make his Bundesliga debut. Upon making his debut, Dahoud became the first Syrian-born player to ever play in the Bundesliga.

2015–16 season
Following the sacking of Favre early in the 2015–16 Bundesliga season, Dahoud saw his game time increase with Die Fohlen, establishing himself as a key figure in new manager André Schubert's midfield. He scored his first goal for the club on 23 September 2015 in Schubert's debut game in charge, netting Gladbach's fourth goal in a 4–2 win over Augsburg. The week prior to Favre's departure, Dahoud made his Champions League debut against Sevilla from the bench before making his full debut against Man City under Schubert later in the month. The immediate impact made by Dahoud in his new starting berth was recognized by the supporters who voted him as the Fans' Player of the Month for September. In October, he received a standing ovation from the Eintracht Frankfurt supporters after delivering an all-conquering performance against their side, scoring once and setting up another two in a 5-1 win. The following year, on Valentine's Day, Dahoud netted the match winning goal in the Rhine Derby against Köln. At the conclusion of the season, Dahoud had made 32 league appearances, scoring 5 goals and assisting 9 as Gladbach ended fourth in the Bundesliga, thereby qualifying for the 2016–17 UEFA Champions League qualifiers.

2016–17 season
In August 2016, Dahoud's agent revealed that he had rejected a new contract with Gladbach based on the understanding that he would be allowed to leave the club at the end of the season. This followed strong reports that Premier League side Liverpool and reigning Ligue 1 champions Paris Saint-Germain had approached Gladbach for his signature. He made his first appearance of the season on 20 August in a 1–0 DFB Pokal win over SV Drochtersen/Assel. He scored his first goal of the season on 26 November, netting the opener in Gladbach's 1–1 Bundesliga draw with Hoffenheim. On 16 March 2017, he scored his first ever goal in European competitions, scoring Gladbach's second in a 2–2 Europa League draw with fellow Bundesliga side Schalke. Dahoud's goal, which had put Gladbach 2–0 up at half-time, was not enough to secure his club's progression, however, as a late rally from Schalke saw Gladbach knocked of the competition on the away goals rule.

With only a year left to run on his contract, Gladbach announced on 30 March that Dahoud would be joining fellow Bundesliga side Borussia Dortmund at the end of the season for a reported fee of €12m. He ultimately played in 41 matches for the campaign, though he was jeered by Gladbach supporters in his latter appearances due to his impending departure, as the club ended the season in ninth position.

Borussia Dortmund

2017–18 season
Dahoud officially joined Borussia Dortmund on 1 July 2017. Dortmund's sporting director Michael Zorc commented, "Mo Dahoud is a highly-talented and exciting central midfield player who we have been keeping very close tabs on for several years now. He has already proven that he can cut it at the highest level." He made his debut for the club on 6 August, starting in a penalty shootout loss to Bayern Munich in the DFL-Supercup. On 12 August 2017, Dahoud assisted Pierre-Emerick Aubameyang in netting BVB's third goal in Dortmund's 4–0 cup win against sixth-tier club 1. FC Rielasingen-Arlen.

2018–19 season
On 26 August 2018, Dahoud scored his first Bundesliga goal for his club in a 4–1 victory over RB Leipzig. He was used sparingly by manager Lucien Favre during the first half of the season, however, with new signings Thomas Delaney and Axel Witsel preferred in midfield.

2019–20 season
Dahoud had a difficult season due to injury, lack of consistency and the competitive situation in the Dortmund midfield, in which he featured in 14 matches in all competitions.

2020–21 season
On 17 February 2021, he scored his first Champions League goal in a 3–2 away win over Sevilla in the 2020–21 UEFA Champions League round of 16. 
On 13 May 2021, Dahoud started in the 2021 DFB-Pokal final against RB Leipzig. He won his second trophy with Borussia Dortmund after winning the final, contributing with an assist to a Jadon Sancho goal in the 5th minute.

2022–2023 
In june 2023 Dahoud will leave the club after the expiry of his contract.

International career

Germany national youth teams
Having previously represented Germany at U18 and U19 level, Dahoud made his debut for the Germany U21 team as a substitute in a 4–1 win over the Faroe Islands on 24 March 2016, before making his full debut a week later against Russia. The following year, he was included in Germany's 23-man squad for the 2017 UEFA European Under-21 Championship in Poland. Germany were ultimately crowned champions, beating Spain 1–0 in the final to claim the title. Dahoud is also eligible to represent Syria, though he stated that he was not interested in doing so, and that he dreamed of playing for Germany.

Senior career
Dahoud made his debut on 7 October 2020, against Turkey in a friendly game.

Personal life
Dahoud was born in Amuda to Kurdish parents, a town in north east Syria (West Kurdistan) He was taken to Germany by his family in 1996. In an interview with the official Bundesliga website, he revealed that his footballing idol is French legend Zinedine Zidane. He has been able to speak  Kurdish, German and Arabic since childhood.

Career statistics

Club

1 Includes DFB-Pokal matches.
2 Includes UEFA Europa League and UEFA Champions League matches.
3 Includes DFL-Supercup matches.

International

Honours
Borussia Dortmund
 DFB-Pokal: 2020–21
 DFL-Supercup: 2019

Germany
UEFA European Under-21 Championship: 2017

References

External links

Profile at the Borussia Dortmund website

1996 births
Living people
German footballers
Germany youth international footballers
Germany under-21 international footballers
Germany international footballers
Association football midfielders
Borussia Mönchengladbach II players
Borussia Mönchengladbach players
Borussia Dortmund players
Naturalized citizens of Germany
Syrian emigrants to Germany
German people of Syrian descent
Bundesliga players